Lepidozikania cinerascens is a moth of the family Erebidae first described by Francis Walker in 1855. It is found in Brazil.

References

Phaegopterina
Arctiinae of South America